Dismember is a Swedish death metal band formed in 1988. They split up in 2011 but reunited in 2019. Pioneers of Swedish death metal, Dismember is now considered one of the country's "big four", alongside Entombed, Grave, and Unleashed.

History

Formation and Nuclear Blast-era (1988–2002)
The band formed in Stockholm in 1988. After a hiatus, during which several members joined Carnage, the band began recording in earnest in 1991 and released their debut album Like an Ever Flowing Stream that year. The album is today heralded as a milestone for the burgeoning Swedish death metal scene and established the band's fanbase, which was further bolstered by the controversy surrounding one song in particular, "Skin Her Alive". The song prompted an obscenity charge in the United Kingdom, against which the band successfully defended themselves.

In 1992, Dismember released the Pieces EP, and the following year continued with second album, Indecent & Obscene, which featured their song "Dreaming in Red"; the "Dreaming in Red" videoclip was shown in MTV's Headbangers Ball. According to an interview with fellow Nuclear Blast group Benediction in metallian.com, Dismember and the said band got into a business dispute and eventually a fisticuff at this stage over tour arrangements and monies owed.

Like many of the other Scandinavian death metal bands, Dismember began softening their sound in the mid-1990s, with 1995's Massive Killing Capacity having more melodic approaches, which had a good public response. Nevertheless, they attempted a return to style with 1997's Death Metal, which ultimately became a sales disappointment. Their last album for Nuclear Blast was 2000's Hate Campaign.

Switching labels (2003–2006)
Around 2003, Dismember set a new path and signed for Karmageddon Records. In 2004, they released their sole album with that label titled Where Ironcrosses Grow which some thought sounds close to Hate Campaign and was inspired by Iron Maiden and Autopsy.

They switched record companies again in 2005, signing to Regain Records, which bought the rights to their earlier albums as well and released them as luxury digipak editions. In 2006, Dismember released their seventh album The God That Never Was, which continued in the style of its predecessor. The band spent February on the road in Europe. In November 2006, Dismember toured Europe as part of the Masters of Death tour, with Grave, Unleashed, Entombed, and Exterminator.

Split with Fred Estby and final album (2007–2010)
After the release of The God That Never Was and some touring, Estby left the band "after long and careful consideration". In a posting on the official site on 20 April 2007, Estby cites the demands of touring and the needs of his family as key reasons for him leaving the band. His statements appears as "My decision to put my family in first hand makes it impossible to keep on touring and commit to the band full time. I want to thank all the fans, friends, bands and all the other cool people I've met through the years and I wish Dismember all the best in the future. Fred."

In April 2008, they released their eighth album, Dismember.

Dismember released a two-disc DVD titled Under Blood Red Skies in late July 2009. The live concerts were filmed in the Netherlands and at the 2008 Party San Open Air Festival in Bad Berka, Germany. The DVD also included a documentary and interviews with band members. The cover art was created by Erik Danielsson of Trident Art.

Breakup and reunion (2011–present)
On 16 October 2011, bassist Tobias Cristiansson revealed in a statement that Dismember had broken up: "After 23 years, Dismember have now decided to quit. We wish to thank all our fans for your support."

On a possible reunion, drummer Fred Estby told Invisible Oranges in August 2016: "People were telling me that all the time. So maybe we should try to do some shows and get everything back. We always owned our rights to the albums and shirts, but there's still loose ends to tie up. I just wanted to set the record straight and hopefully do some shows in the future."

In February 2018, rumors were afloat that Dismember was planning to reunite that year to celebrate the 30th anniversary of its formation. A reunion was teased that summer when the band posted random photos on their Facebook account. After nearly a year of rumors, it was announced on 14 January 2019 that the original lineup of Dismember had reunited and performed together for the first time in over 20 years at Scandinavia Deathfest that October.

In a May 2021 interview MetalBite.com, drummer Fred Estby stated that Dismember might consider releasing their first studio album in over a decade in either 2022 or 2023: "I hope we get out of this situation soon so that we can play some shows and we wanna get more shows going across the globe, a lot of territories that we haven't booked shows for yet and I hope that's gonna happen as soon as this is all over. And maybe we'll have a new record out in a year or two."

Discography

Demos
 Dismembered (1988)
 Last Blasphemies (1989)
 Rehearsal (1989)
 Reborn in Blasphemy (1990)

Albums
 Like an Ever Flowing Stream (1991)
 Indecent & Obscene (1993)
 Massive Killing Capacity (1995)
 Death Metal (1997)
 Hate Campaign (2000)
 Where Ironcrosses Grow (2004)
 The God That Never Was (2006)
 Dismember (2008)

Singles and EPs
 "Skin Her Alive" (single, 1991)
 Pieces (EP, 1992)
 Casket Garden (EP, 1995)
 Misanthropic (EP, 1997)

DVDs and videos
 Live Blasphemies (DVD, 2004)
 Under Blood Red Skies (DVD, 2009)

Members
Line-up
 Fred Estby – drums (1988–2007, 2019–present)
 David Blomqvist – lead guitar (1988, 1990–2011, 2019–present), rhythm guitar (2003–2005), bass (1988–1990, 2005–2006)
 Robert Sennebäck – rhythm guitar (1988–1998, 2019–present), lead guitar (1988–1990), vocals (1988–1989)
 Matti Kärki – vocals (1989–2011, 2019–present)
 Richard Cabeza (a.k.a. Richard Diamon/Daemon) – bass (1990–1998, 2000–2004, 2019–present)

Former members
 Johan Bergebäck – bass (2004–2005)
 Sharlee D'Angelo – bass (1998–2000)
 Magnus Sahlgren – rhythm guitar (1998–2003)
 Erik Gustafsson – bass (1988)
 Martin Persson – rhythm guitar (2005–2011), bass (2005–2006)
 Tobias Cristiansson – bass (2006–2011)
 Thomas Daun – drums (2007–2011)

Timeline

References

Bibliography
Daniel Ekeroth. Swedish Death Metal. Brooklyn: Bazillion Points Books, 2008
Mudrian, Albert. Choosing Death: the Improbable History of Death Metal and Grindcore. New York: Feral House, 2004

External links
 
 Dismember at WorldMusicDatabase

Swedish death metal musical groups
Musical groups established in 1988
Musical groups disestablished in 2011
Musical groups reestablished in 2019